Sir Paul Stephen Kenny (born 31 October 1949) is a British former trade union leader. He served as General Secretary of the GMB, Britain's third biggest union.

Early life

Kenny left school at 15 and went to work for Fuller, Smith & Turner's Brewery. He went to Latimer Foundation School in Hammersmith, which was closed; he was transferred to St Marks School at Bishops Park in Fulham. His first job in local government was for London Borough of Hammersmith as the park keeper of Brook Green, along with its tennis courts.

Trade unions
Kenny became a full-time GMB official in December 1979. In 1991 he became the Regional Secretary of the GMB London Region.

GMB leadership
Kenny had been defeated by Kevin Curran in the 2003 GMB General Secretary Election to replace John Edmonds. However, he was appointed Acting General Secretary on 24 March 2005 following Curran's resignation after alleged election rigging.

In May 2006 he was elected unopposed as GMB General Secretary. He was elected again in 2010 for a further five years unopposed.

Between 2010 and 2016, he was the chair of the influential Trade Union & Labour Party Liaison Organisation.

Campaigns
Kenny has been heavily involved in campaigns, including ASDA, private equity companies (such as their ownership of the AA), public sector pay increases, and privatised utility companies. He led target campaigning against blacklisting of trade unionists by the construction industry. In August 2014, Kenny was one of 200 public figures who were signatories to a letter to The Guardian opposing Scottish independence in the run-up to September's referendum on that issue.

Personal life

Kenny now lives on the Isle of Wight. He married Patricia Ward in 1969 in Hammersmith. He has two sons and four grandchildren, and supports Fulham F.C.

In the 2015 Queen's Birthday Honours, Kenny was appointed a Knight Bachelor "for services to trades unions".

References

External links
 Times article September 2007
 BBC interview 2002

Audio clips
 Discussing public sector pay on the BBC in August 2008

News items
 MPs' pay in December 2006

1949 births
Living people
General Secretaries of the GMB (trade union)
People from Hammersmith
Knights Bachelor
Members of the General Council of the Trades Union Congress
Presidents of the Trades Union Congress